Eileen Mary O'Donnell (born 1 July 1993), known professionally as Eileen O'Donnell, is an Irish model and international beauty pageant titleholder. O'Donnell started her career in 2011 and has since modelled in the categories of fashion, skincare and swimwear. She has gone on to collaborate with numerous notable brands including Pretty Little Thing, GymKing, MVMT Watches, The Couture Club, Ziaja Skincare, Benefit Cosmetics, amongst others.

Since 2016, she has represented Ireland in a number of international competitions and pageantries. She won the title of Miss Bikini Ireland in 2017 and participated in the Swimsuit USA International Model Search in 2018. She was crowned Miss Earth Ireland 2020.

Early life and education 
O'Donnell was born in 1993 and raised in Derry, the second-largest city in Northern Ireland for the entirety of her childhood. In 2002 at the age of 9, she took part in a cross-community project that enabled her to experience life in the United States for 6 weeks.

Modelling and pageantry career 
In 2016 O'Donnell expressed her interest in participating in the 5th annual Miss Bikini Ireland competition in which she finished in 3rd place. She entered again in the following year for the 6th annual competition. After entering Miss Bikini Ireland 2017, O'Donnell was crowned the winner, picking up a €15,000 reward and an all-expenses-paid trip to the world finals of Swimsuit USA (SUSA) International for the chance of winning a prize worth $80,000.

After winning Miss Bikini Ireland 2017, O'Donnell qualified for competing in Swimsuit USA International Model 2017 in which she finished in the top 30 finalists. She re-qualified to represent Ireland in the following year. The competition was held in Mexico City and 70 women from a total of 50 countries participated. O'Donnell, placed 16 in the competition, however, states she was grateful for the opportunity as it opened up doors for her in her career.

In 2020, she was chosen to participate in the 20th annual Miss Earth competition and represent her home country of Ireland. The pageant was hosted by James Deakin and telecast on TV5 and FOXlife, with a virtual tour of the world in the opening number and featured the delegates in their eco-angel and respective national costumes. She came third place for the category of swimsuit and was crowned the winner of Miss Earth Ireland 2020. As Miss Earth Ireland, O'Donnell campaigned to reduce waste in Ireland.

Activism
As the face of Miss Earth 2020, Eileen has campaigned for education as being a basic need for students from all around the world. O'Donnell also advocates on environmental issues, waste management specifically. She has used the word "WASTE" to be an acronym for "We All Should Treasure Earth" in her advocacy.

Awards and positions

References

External links 
 Official website
 

1993 births
Female models from Northern Ireland
Living people
Models from Derry (city)
Environmentalists from Northern Ireland
Beauty pageant contestants
Miss Earth 2020 contestants
Irish women activists
Beauty pageant contestants from Ireland
Irish women environmentalists